Ali Adem Musse (born 1 January 1996) is a Somali professional footballer who plays as a winger for Canadian Premier League club Cavalry FC.

Early life
Born in Somalia, Ali moved to Canada at a young age. He began playing youth football with Earl Grey Community Centre. From 2005 to 2009, he played with Winnipeg South End United SC. In 2010, he began playing with WSA Winnipeg. He also played for the Manitoba provincial team in 2009 and 2011. In 2011, he joined the Vancouver Whitecaps Academy. After returning to WSA Winnipeg, he returned to the Whitecaps Academy in 2014. In 2013, he was awarded the Manitoba Soccer Special Achievement Award.

College career
In 2015, he attended Tyler Junior College, where he played for the men's soccer team. He scored two goals in his debut over Jacksonville College on August 29. With Tyler, he advanced to the national finals, where they were defeated by the Louisburg College Hurricances.

In 2017, he began attending the Northern Alberta Institute of Technology. He made his debut on September 9, scoring all four goals in a 4-1 victory over the University of Alberta-Augustana, earning Player of the Game honours.

Club career
From 2011 to 2013, he played for WSA Winnipeg in the Premier Development League. In 2014, while with the Vancouver Whitecaps Academy, he also played with the Vancouver Whitecaps U23 in the PDL. Afterwards, he returned to WSA Winnipeg. 

In 2017, Musse began playing for the Calgary Foothills. In the season debut on May 5, 2017, he scored the winning goal in a 4-3 victory over the TSS FC Rovers. He helped the team reach the PDL final in 2017. In 2018, he scored five goals in four playoff games as the Foothills won the PDL title, including scoring two goals in extra time in the championship final victory over Reading United AC.

In February 2019, Musse signed a professional contract with Canadian Premier League club Valour FC, from his hometown of Winnipeg. FC Edmonton had also sought to sign him, with his family now based out of Edmonton, but he chose to return to Winnipeg and sign with Valour to re-unite with head coach Rob Gale who hehad played for during his time in the Canadian national team program. He scored his first goal on June 2, 2019 against FC Edmonton in a 1-0 victory. Ahead of the 2020 season, he was released by the club.

In 2020, he signed with German club 1. FCA Darmstadt in the seventh-tier Gruppenliga.

In June 2021, Musse returned to Calgary and signed with Canadian club Cavalry FC on a one year contract. On July 14, 2022, he scored a brace in a 3-0 victory over HFX Wanderers FC. He missed much of his first season due to injury. On October 2, 2022, he scored the winning goal in a 2-1 victory over Valour FC to clinch a playoff spot for the club. Musse led the club in scoring in 2022 with seven goals and four assists, across all competitions. In January 2023, Musse signed a new two-year deal with Cavalry, with an option for 2025.

International career

Canada
In the summer of 2007, he attended a Canadian national team evaluation camp. In November 2011, Musse received his first Canadian youth national team call-up for a Canada U16 camp in Costa Rica. He was subsequently named to the squad for the 2013 CONCACAF U-17 Championship, where he won a bronze medal, as well as playing at the 2013 FIFA U-17 World Cup.

Somalia
In December 2019, Musse was called up by Somalia for the 2019 CECAFA Cup. He made his debut as a starter in the opening match in a 0–0 draw against Djibouti.

Career statistics

References

External links

Ali Musse at FuPa

1996 births
Living people
Somalian footballers
Canadian soccer players
Association football forwards
Sportspeople from Mogadishu
Soccer players from Winnipeg
Somalian emigrants to Canada
Naturalized citizens of Canada
Somalian expatriate footballers
Canadian expatriate soccer players
Expatriate footballers in Germany
Canadian expatriate sportspeople in Germany
FC Manitoba players
Calgary Foothills FC players
Valour FC players
Cavalry FC players
USL League Two players
Canadian Premier League players
Canada men's youth international soccer players
Somalia international footballers